James Sweeney (1868-1919) was an American architect practicing in New London, Connecticut.

Life and career
James Sweeney was born December 27, 1868, in New London, Connecticut, to John Sweeney and Bridget (Halvey) Sweeney. After an education at the Bulkeley School, he worked for the New London water department, where he learned the essentials of drafting and civil engineering. Circa 1888 he began working for George Warren Cole, representative in New London of the Boston firm of Shepley, Rutan & Coolidge, and worked on projects such as the New London Public Library and the Williams Memorial Institute (both 1889–91). In 1891, when Cole established an independent office in New London, he made Sweeney his chief assistant. When Cole died in 1893 his Boston partner, Joseph Everett Chandler, consolidated his practice in Boston, and Sweeney took over the business in New London. He built extensively in New London, his most prominent work being the Beaux-Arts reconstruction of the New London Municipal Building in 1912.

Sweeney was a private practitioner for his entire professional career, and continued to work until his death in 1919. After his death, his practice was purchased by Halifax architect A. Graham Creighton, who then lived and practiced in New London for forty years.

Sweeney preferred the Colonial Revival style for his architecture, though he used elements of Beaux-Arts architecture in his large municipal projects and the Gothic Revival style for his only church.

Personal life
Sweeney was elected a member of the American Institute of Architects in 1912.

Sweeney died July 3, 1919, in New London.

Legacy
At least two of Sweeney's works have been listed on the United States National Register of Historic Places, and others contribute to listed historic districts.

Architectural works
 Lyric Hall, New London, Connecticut (1897)
 St. Mary R. C. School (former), New London, Connecticut (1898)
 House for James P. Murphy, New London, Connecticut (1901)
 Union Bank and Trust Company Building, New London, Connecticut (1905, demolished)
 Harbor School, New London, Connecticut (1907)
 Mabrey Hotel, New London, Connecticut (1910)
 Old Saybrook Town Hall (former), Old Saybrook, Connecticut (1910–11, NRHP 2007)
 New London Municipal Building, New London, Connecticut (1912)
 House for Ludwig Mann, New London, Connecticut (1915)
 Our Lady of Perpetual Help R. C. Church (former), New London, Connecticut (1915)
 Thames Hall, Connecticut College, New London, Connecticut (1915, demolished 1990)
 Flanders School (former), East Lyme, Connecticut (1916)
 New London Almshouse, New London, Connecticut (1916–17)
 Quaker Hill School, Waterford, Connecticut (1917)

Gallery of architectural works

Notes

References

Architects from Connecticut
20th-century American architects
People from New London, Connecticut
1868 births
1919 deaths